"Remember You're Mine" is a song written by Bernie Lowe and Kal Mann and performed by Pat Boone.  It reached #5 on the UK Singles Chart and #6 on the U.S. pop chart in 1957.

Billy Vaughn conducted the music on the song and it was produced by Randy Wood.

Other versions
Dee Dee Sharp released a version of the song on her 1962 album, It's Mashed Potato Time.

References

1957 songs
1957 singles
Songs written by Bernie Lowe
Songs with lyrics by Kal Mann
Pat Boone songs
Dee Dee Sharp songs
Dot Records singles